In mathematics, Hall's identity may be:
 The Hall–Witt identity 
 The Hall identity [ [x,y]2,z] = 0 for 2 by 2 matrices, showing that this is a polynomial identity ring
 The Hall–Petresco identity for groups expressing xmym in terms of powers of elements of the descending central series.

Group theory